Calymmaria persica is a species of true spider in the family Cybaeidae. It is found in the United States.

References

Cybaeidae
Articles created by Qbugbot
Spiders described in 1847